José Acasuso and Sebastián Prieto were the defending champions, but Acasuso did not participate this year.  Prieto partnered Martín García, losing in the first round.

Paul Capdeville and Óscar Hernández won the title, defeating Albert Montañés and Rubén Ramírez-Hidalgo 4–6, 6–4, [10–6] in the final.

Seeds

 Martín García /  Sebastián Prieto (first round)
 Luis Horna /  Sergio Roitman (first round)
 Marcelo Melo /  André Sá (semifinals)
 Pablo Cuevas /  Adrián García (first round, García withdrew because of a back injury)

Draw

Draw

External links
Draw

Doubles